Natasha Sagardia (born 1986), is a top-ranked International Bodyboarding Association (IBA) world tour competitor and is the 2008 International Surfing Association (ISA) World Gold Medalist in the Women's Bodyboard category. Sagardia was born in Río Cuarto, Córdoba, Argentina and moved to Puerto Rico with her parents when she was nine. Sagardia entered the surfing history books, becoming the first Puerto Rican in history to win a gold medal at the ISA World Surfing Games.

In 2015, she announced her retirement from professional bodyboarding.

See also

 List of Puerto Ricans

References

 http://ibaworldtour.com/womens-rankings
 https://web.archive.org/web/20100715183427/http://www.isasurf.org/ev_d_wc.php

External links
 Surfer Natasha Sagardía recibe apoyo del DRD. El Vocero (Spanish newspaper article)
Entrevista A Natasha Sagardía Campeona Mundial De Bodyboarding Isa. Vidadeporte (Interview in Spanish)
 http://natashasagardia.com

Puerto Rican sportspeople
Living people
1986 births
Bodyboarders